is a JR West Geibi Line station located in 2-chōme, Hesaka Sōda, Higashi-ku, Hiroshima, Hiroshima Prefecture, Japan.

History
1916-04-25: Hesaka Station opens
1987-04-01: Japanese National Railways is privatized, and Hesaka Station becomes a JR West station

Station building and platforms
Hesaka Station features one side platform capable of handling one line. Trains bound for Shiwaguchi and Miyoshi are handled on the upper end (上り) of the platform, and trains bound for Hiroshima are handled on the lower end (下り). The station is unmanned, featuring an automated ticket vending machine. The Hesaka Station building is a small waiting area with a galvanized roof.

Environs
Hiroshima Jōhoku Gakuen (Jōhoku High School and Jōhoku Junior High School)
Suikō Apartments
Hiroshima Hesaka Nakamachi Post Office
Hiroshima Municipal Gion Elementary School
Hiroshima Municipal Hara Elementary School
Hiroshima Municipal Hesaka Elementary School
Hiroshima Municipal Gion Higashi Junior High School
Ōshimo Academy Gion High School
Hijiyama University
Hiroshima Chūō Women's Junior College
JR West Kabe Line Shimo-Gion Station
JR West Kabe Line Furuichibashi Station
Hiroshima Rapid Transit Astramline Nishihara Station
Ōta River

Highway access
Japan National Route 54
 Hiroshima Prefectural Route 37 (Hiroshima-Miyoshi Route)
 Hiroshima Prefectural Route 152 (Fuchū-Gion Route)
 Hiroshima Prefectural Route 277 (Furuichi-Hiroshima Route)

Connecting lines
All lines are JR West lines. 
Geibi Line
Miyoshi Express
No stop
Commuter Liner
No stop
Miyoshi Liner/Local
Akiyaguchi Station — Hesaka Station — Yaga Station

External links
 JR West

Geibi Line
Hiroshima City Network
Stations of West Japan Railway Company in Hiroshima city
Railway stations in Japan opened in 1916